The sixth series of the BBC espionage television series Spooks began broadcasting on 16 October 2007 before ending on 18 December 2007. The series, consisting of ten episodes, was serialised - a first for the programme. Appearing as recurring characters are CIA Agent, Bob Hogan, and Iranian Special Consul, Dariush Bakhshi, and his wife, Ana.

Production
In June 2007 production visited Cliffe in Rochester in Kent to film various rural scenes, including a scene on a railway bridge for Episode 8 “Infiltration”.

Cast
Main
 Rupert Penry-Jones as Adam Carter
 Hermione Norris as Ros Myers (episodes 1–8)
 Miranda Raison as Jo Portman
 Alex Lanipekun as Ben Kaplan (episodes 5–10)
 Raza Jaffrey as Zafar Younis (episode 1)
 Hugh Simon as Malcolm Wynn-Jones
 Gemma Jones as Connie James (episodes 2–10)
 Peter Firth as Harry Pearce

Guests
 Matthew Marsh as Bob Hogan
 Simon Abkarian as Dariush Bakhshi
Agni Scott as Ana Bakhshi
 Claire Cox as Anne Beuchet
 James Laurenson as Sholto
 Robert Glenister as Nicholas Blake (episodes 1, 2 & 9)
Alex Dee as Agent Bill
 Ofo Uhiara as Michael Johnson
 Anna Chancellor as Juliet Shaw
 Sam Spruell as Jason Belling
Guy Gallagher as Boscard

Episodes

Notes

References

External links
 

2007 British television seasons
Iran in fiction
Spooks (TV series)